"Baby I'm a Fool" is a song written and composed by American jazz singer-songwriter Melody Gardot. It was released as the second single from her second full-length album, My One and Only Thrill. According to Gardot, the lyrics are about "two coquette people who won't admit they are in love with each other." A live rendition of the song was also recorded and released on her Live from SoHo EP. It also appeared in her 2018 live album Live in Europe.

Music video
A music video for "Baby I'm a Fool" was directed by Aaron Platt produced by Justin Cronkite, and filmed entirely in black-and-white. The video displays Gardot resting in an Clawfoot bathtub flanked by dancers dressed in tuxedos who perform an elaborate choreographic sequence to the rhythm of the song.

Charts

References

External links

2009 singles
Melody Gardot songs
2009 songs
Songs written by Melody Gardot
Verve Records singles